Nakia Sanford (born May 10, 1976) is a professional women's basketball center most recently with the Seattle Storm of the Women's National Basketball Association (WNBA).

College career
Sanford finished her career at Kansas ranked fourth all-time rebounder (832) and shot-blocker (89).

Kansas statistics

WNBA career
Sanford was not drafted. She was signed by the Washington Mystics before the 2003 WNBA season. During her first three-season, she saw limited action. It was not until the 2006 WNBA season that Sanford began to show progress as a player. She set career highs for all her stats in 2006, including rebounds per game (6.0) and field goal percentage (52%). In 2007, she set new career highs averaging 7 rebounds and 11 points per game. She saw decreased playing time during the 2008 WNBA season, however.

References

1976 births
Living people
Abdullah Gül Üniversitesi basketball players
American expatriate basketball people in Turkey
American women's basketball players
Basketball players from Georgia (U.S. state)
Centers (basketball)
Kansas Jayhawks women's basketball players
People from Lithonia, Georgia
Phoenix Mercury players
Power forwards (basketball)
Seattle Storm players
Sportspeople from DeKalb County, Georgia
Washington Mystics players
Undrafted Women's National Basketball Association players